Crime in Lesotho has high rate, ranging from carjacking, home invasion, robbery, sexual assault etc. Most of the reported crime incidents in the country are of opportunity for immediate gain.

Location
Most of the crime in Lesotho happen in urban areas. Crime rate in Maseru is five times higher than other districts and crime rate in Leribe and Mafeteng are also generally higher than other districts.

Law enforcement agency
Lesotho Mounted Police Service is the national police force dealing with crime in the country.

Types of crime
Organized crimes in the country usually involve people from South Africa in which they focus on human trafficking and vehicle theft.

See also
 Human trafficking in Lesotho

References